The Characiosiphonaceae are a family of algae in the order Chlamydomonadales.

References

External links

Chlamydomonadales
Chlorophyceae families